José Luis García Agraz (born 16 November 1952) is a Mexican film director. He was born in Mexico City in 1952. He studied at the Centro de Estudios Cinematográficos (or CUEC) at UNAM.

Writer and Director
His script Los supersabios was turned into an animated feature in 1975. He was assistant director to José Estrada in Maten al león (1975) and Los indolentes; to Julián Pastor in El esperado amor desesperado (1975) and La casta divina (1976); to Gonzalo Martínez in Del otro lado del puente (1977), and to Arturo Ripstein in La viuda negra (1977) and Cadena perpetua (1978).

His first short film Háblame de Rita (1979), which he also wrote, was shown at the International Documentary and Short Film Festival in Bilbao. His second short Patricio (1982) received an Ariel award. It was also selected for the Festival Internacional de Nuevo Cine in Havana and once again the Bilbao short film festival. His other shorts include Saxofón (1987), Solamente una vez (1988), Ladrón de sábado (1990) and El último tren (1996).

Along with Fernando Cámara, Toño Betancourt, Nerio Barbieris and Marcelo Llacarino, Agraz founded the film cooperative Kinam to realize his debut feature Nocaut, which he also wrote. Nocaut won the Ariel for best debut film. It also won the Heraldo and the Diosa de Plata awards. The film was shown at film festivals in Amiens, Madrid and New York City among others.

Agraz followed up with a number of features, notable among which are Sueños de oro / Dreams of gold (a co-production between México and the USA, 1984); La paloma azul (a Japanese-Mexican co-production, 1989); and Desiertos mares (1993), which won him the best director prize at the Ariel awards in 1994. He repeated the feat in 2004 with El Misterio del Trinidad.

Educational work 

He has also made a number of documentaries and educational programs for television. As a professor of film, he has taught at the Universidad Iberoamericana, the Instituto de Comunicación Audiovisual de Monterrey (ICAM), the Universidad Metropolitana de Xochimilco and the Universidad Anáhuac.

References

Mexican film directors
1952 births
Living people